Martine Rose (born November 24, 1980) is a British-Jamaican menswear designer and founder of the Martine Rose label. Her designs draw inspiration from her experiences and interest in rave, hip-hop and punk subcultures.

Early life and education 
Rose was born in Croydon, South London in 1980; her family is British and Jamaican. Rose's mother was a nurse and her father was an accountant so she spent much of her time in Tooting with her grandmother and her cousins. After a year at Camberwell College of Arts she enrolled at Middlesex University and graduated in 2002 with a degree in fashion design.

Career 
Rose first started a label LMNOP with now-stylist Tamara Rothstein, a friend and frequent collaborator. The line folded in 2005. In 2007 she established her eponymous label focused on menswear.

Since its inception, Rose has been known for showing her collections in non-traditional spaces, including a street market, a community climbing gym, and a cul-de-sac in Camden, London . She has been known to disregard fashion's seasonal calendar and expectations, sometimes because of financial constraints. Some of her collections have been released via short films, digital lookbooks, and Craigslist.

In 2011 she was supported by new talent showcase Fashion East during London Fashion Week. She also collaborated with workwear boots manufacturer CAT on a limited line of boots.

In 2015, when fashion designer Demna Gvesalia joined Balenciaga as creative director, he hired Rose as a consultant, elevating her profile in the fashion industry.

In 2018 Rose released a collaboration with Nike. The release included Rose's take on the tracksuit and Nike's Monarch model. She was inspired by English and American sports culture. The collection was released on Craigslist in London and later sold at retailers.

Her AW20 show took place at Torriano Primary School, her daughter's primary school in Kentish Town.

Design 
As a designer, Rose counts her upbringing around her older British-Jamaican cousins who were into raves, reggae, Lovers rock, punk, and dance music as formative. Rose has been influenced by her own experiences at 90s London raves and her awareness of different subcultures in the city coming together around music. Overall, she considers her Jamaican upbringing as a major influence in her attitude towards fashion design and style.

Rose's label developed a cult following, with her designs featuring exaggerated proportions quickly becoming characteristic of her collections earlier on in her career. While considered a menswear designer, Rose designs her pieces with a broad spectrum of people in mind. Her interest in nightlife and music scenes has led her to use fabrics in menswear that are typically more common in womenswear, like fur, satin and lurex.

References 

1980 births
Living people
British people of Jamaican descent
Black British fashion people
British women fashion designers